The 1986 Prague Skate was held November 1986. Medals were awarded in the disciplines of men's singles, ladies' singles and pair skating.

Men

Ladies

Pairs

References

Prague Skate
Prague Skate